The 2018 Okolo Slovenska was a five-stage men's professional road cycling race. The race is the 62nd edition of the Okolo Slovenska. It was rated as a 2.1 event as part of the 2018 UCI Europe Tour. The race started in Poprad on 12 September and finish on 16 September in Galanta.

The Frenchmen rider Julian Alaphilippe of  won the general classification, by taking first place at the summit finish in Štrbské Pleso. He won the race by sixteen seconds overall, from 's Jan Tratnik, Benedetti completed the podium.

Teams
The 21 teams invited to the race were:

Route

Stages

Prologue
12 September 2018 Poprad, (Individual time trial)

Stage 1
13 September 2018 Poprad to Štrbské Pleso,

Stage 2
14 September 2018 Ružomberok to Dubnica nad Váhom,

Stage 3
15 September 2018 Dubnica nad Váhom to Nitra,

Stage 4
16 September 2018 Nitra to Galanta,

Classification leadership
In the 2018 Tour of Slovakia, five jerseys were awarded. The general classification was calculated by adding each cyclist's finishing times on each stage. The leader of the general classification received a yellow jersey sponsored by national lottery TIPOS. This classification was considered the most important of the 2018 Tour of Slovakia, and the winner of the classification was considered the winner of the race.

The second classification was the points classification. Riders were awarded points for finishing in the top ten in a stage. Points were also won in intermediate sprints. The leader of the points classification was awarded a white jersey with blue polka-dots sponsored by Škoda.

There was also a mountains classification for which points were awarded for reaching the top of a climb before other riders. The climbs were categorized, in order of increasing difficulty, as second and first-category. The leadership of the mountains classification was marked by a white jersey with red polka-dots sponsored by private equity company janom.

The fourth jersey represented the under-23 classification, marked by a white jersey sponsored by Minister of Education, Science, Research and Sport. Only riders born after 1 January 1996 were eligible; the under-23 best placed rider in the general classification was the leader of the under 23 classification. Additionally there was also a classification for Slovakian riders, marked by a white, blue and red jersey. Only Slovakian riders were eligible and they were awarded according to their placement in the general classification of the race.

There was also a classification for Combativity given after each stage to the rider considered, by the organisers, the most combative rider. The winner wore a red bib for the next stage. The final classification was the team classification, in which the times of the best three cyclists in a team on each stage were added together; the leading team at the end of the race was the team with the lowest cumulative time.

 In stage three, Jan Tratnik, who was second in the points classification, wore the white with blue polka-dots jersey, because first placed Julian Alaphilippe wore the yellow jersey as leader of the general classification.

Final standings

General classification

Points classification

Mountains classification

Under-23 rider classification

Team classification

Notes and references

References

Notes

External links

2018 UCI Europe Tour
2018 in Slovak sport
Okolo Slovenska